Wimbledon is a Grand Slam tennis tournament held in Wimbledon, England, United Kingdom  at the All England Lawn Tennis and Croquet Club in the area of SW19. Since 1968, this tournament become open to professionals, and it joined the Open Era of tennis.

The men who have reached the final at least five times during the open era are Jimmy Connors, Björn Borg, John McEnroe, Boris Becker, Pete Sampras, Roger Federer, Rafael Nadal, and Novak Djokovic. Connors reached the final six times between 1974 and 1984 but won only two titles. Borg reached six consecutive finals between 1976 and 1981 and won all but the last final. McEnroe reached five consecutive finals from 1980 through 1984, and won three titles. Becker won three titles out of seven finals between 1985 and 1995. Sampras never lost a final, and he took seven titles between 1993 and 2000. Federer has appeared in a record twelve finals overall, winning a record eight; he also reached a record seven consecutive finals from 2003 through 2009 .  Nadal has appeared in five finals from 2006 through 2011, failing to reach the 2009 final. Of the five finals, he won two. Since 2011, Djokovic has made seven finals appearances, winning six.

The women who have reached the final at least five times during the open era are Billie Jean King, Evonne Goolagong Cawley, Chris Evert, Martina Navratilova, Steffi Graf, Venus Williams, and Serena Williams. King appeared in all finals from 1968 through 1975, except in 1971 and 1974. She won once in her first three finals (1968), before she took the victory in her last three finals. Goolagong Cawley reached five finals between 1971 and 1980 but won only her first and last finals. Evert reached ten finals out of 13 years between 1973 and 1985 but won only three titles. Navratilova won nine of her 12 finals between 1978 and 1994. Graf reached nine finals between 1987 and 1999, which she won seven times. Since 2000, Venus Williams has won the final five times in nine attempts. Her sister Serena Williams has appeared in eleven finals since 2002, in which she won seven titles.

Gentlemen

During the 53 times that this tournament has been held in the open era, 41 men have reached the Wimbledon gentlemen's singles final. The final has included men from 19 different nationalities. The most represented nations are the United States and Australia with Sweden, Switzerland, Czechoslovakia, Germany, and Serbia represented to a lesser extent.
* = Champion

Most recent final

Multiple-time opponents in the open era

Most consecutive finals in the open era

Bolded Years^ indicates Active or Current Streak

Ladies

During the 53 times that this tournament has been held in the open era, 38 women have reached the Wimbledon ladies' singles final. The final has included women from 16 different nationalities. The United States is the most represented by a large margin, with Australia, Czechoslovakia/Czech Republic, Spain, and France represented to a lesser extent.
* = Champion

Most recent final

Multiple-time opponents in the open era

Most consecutive finals in the open era

Bolded Years^ indicates Active or Current Streak

See also

List of Australian Open singles finalists during the Open Era
List of French Open singles finalists during the Open Era
List of US Open singles finalists during the Open Era

Notes
 Martina Navratilova was born in Czechoslovakia but lost her citizenship in 1975. She became a United States citizen in 1981. Her Czech citizenship was restored in 2008.
 Monica Seles was born in Yugoslavia but became a United States citizen in 1994.

References

External links
Wimbledon - Gentlemen's Singles Finals Honour Roll
Wimbledon - Ladies' Singles Finals Honour Roll

Open Era